
Murillo may refer to:

Places
 Murillo, Ontario, a Canadian township named after Bartolomé Esteban Murillo
 Murillo, Tolima, a Colombian town
 Murillo de Gállego, a municipality in Zaragoza, Aragon, Spain

 Murillo el Fruto, a municipality in Navarre, Spain

Other
 Murillo (surname), including a list of people with the surname
 Murillo Flats, a building listed on the National Register of Historic Places in Polk County, Iowa
 A number of ships named

See also
 Fernando Ramírez de Haro, 15th Count of Murillo, Spanish aristocrat
 Murilo (disambiguation)